Emily Kate Johnston, who publishes as E.K. Johnston, is a Canadian novelist and forensic archaeologist.

Career 

Johnston started writing fan fiction in 2002, and wrote her first manuscript in 2009. Her first book, The Story of Owen: Dragon Slayer of Trondheim, was published in 2014, and is set in an alternate present-day Ontario where dragons are both real and a menace. The review in The New York Times called the book "a clever first step in the career of a novelist who ... has many more songs to sing", it was nominated for the William C. Morris Award in 2015. A sequel, Prairie Fire, followed in 2015.

Johnston's third book was A Thousand Nights, a retelling of One Thousand and One Nights. C.S. Lewis's descriptions of the desert in The Horse and His Boy inspired Johnston in writing her own novel set in the desert. A companion book, Spindle, followed in 2016, which was a reinterpretation of Sleeping Beauty.

Her fifth novel, Exit, Pursued By A Bear, was published in 2016. Inspired by Shakespeare's The Winter's Tale, it tells the story of cheer-leading captain Hermione Winters, who discovers she is pregnant after  being sexually assaulted at a camp party. It was written partially as a challenge, and partially as a response to Stephen Woodworth's 2013 bill to re-criminalise abortion. It was named a "Book of the Year" by several organisations, including NPR, Publishers Weekly, and the New York Public Library. It won the Canadian Children's Book Centre's Amy Mathers Teen Book Award in 2017.

A Star Wars fan, Johnston was asked to write a book on the character Ahsoka Tano. Published in October 2016, Ahsoka fills in the gap between her appearances in The Clone Wars and Rebels. Her second Star Wars novel, Queen's Shadow, was released in March 2019. Featuring Padme Amidala, Queen's Shadow is set in the years between the events of The Phantom Menace and Attack of the Clones. Additionally, she has also written the story By Whatever Sun, focusing on Miara Larte, a character Johnston created within Ahsoka, and set during the events of A New Hope.

Johnston describes her novel That Inevitable Victorian Thing as a "Near-future Sci-fi Canadian Idealistic Romance". It was published in 2017.

She credits her discipline in academic writing for helping her time management while writing prose; and states she is a fast writer – she wrote A Thousand Nights in "about 20 days", and writes with little disturbance. She advises early and young writers to learn to finish projects as practice in self-discipline and editing.

Her favourite authors are Jo Graham, Elizabeth Wein, Tessa Gratton, Kiersten White, Madeleine L'Engle, JRR Tolkien, David Eddings, CS Lewis, and Holly Black. She plays the alto saxophone and the clarinet.

Johnston released another Star Wars novel, Queen's Peril, on June 2, 2020.

Personal life 
Johnston is biromantic and demisexual.

Bibliography

Novels 

 The Story of Owen: Dragon Slayer of Trondheim (2014)
 Prairie Fire (2015)
 A Thousand Nights (2015)
 Spindle (2016) – also published as Kingdom of Sleep
 Exit, Pursued By A Bear (2016)
 That Inevitable Victorian Thing (2017)
 The Afterward (2019)
 Aetherbound (2021)

Short stories 

 Work In Progress (2017) in Three Sides of A Heart: Stories about Love Triangles, edited by Natalie Parker

Star Wars 

 Ahsoka (2016)
 "By Whatever Sun" (2017), short story in From A Certain Point Of View
 Queen's Shadow (2019)
 Queen's Peril (2020)
Queen's Hope (2022)
Crimson Climb (2023)

Dungeons & Dragons 
 Honor Among Thieves: The Druid's Call (2022)

Awards 

 2015: William C. Morris Award, shortlist (The Story of Owen: Dragon Slayer of Trondheim)
 2017: Amy Mathers Teen Book Award in 2017, winner (Exit, Pursued By A Bear)

References

External links 

 
 

Living people
Women writers of young adult literature
Canadian women novelists
21st-century Canadian novelists
21st-century Canadian women writers
21st-century Canadian short story writers
Canadian writers of young adult literature
Canadian women short story writers
Canadian science fiction writers
Year of birth missing (living people)
Demisexual people